Italy Pass, is a gap at an elevation of 12,408 feet, (3782m) in the Sierra Nevada in Inyo County, California.

References

Mountain passes of the Sierra Nevada (United States)
Landforms of Inyo County, California